The Catholic Church in Benin is part of the worldwide Catholic Church, under the spiritual leadership of the Pope in Rome.

There are an estimated 1.5 million baptised Catholics in the Republic of Benin, or about 23% of the population, in ten dioceses and archdioceses. There are 440 priests and 900 men and women in religious orders.

Description
The Catholic Church in Benin gave one of its most esteemed bishops, Archbishop Bernardin Gantin of Cotonou, to the Roman Curia as Cardinal Prefect of the Sacred Congregation for Bishops and as Dean of the Sacred College of Cardinals. He worked closely and was a personal friend of both Pope John Paul II, who brought him to Rome, and Benedict XVI, who spoke of him when he visited his tomb in Ouidah, Benin in November 2011, as part of a visit to that country. Archbishop Mark Miles has been designated Archbishop of Benin and Togo. 

Within Benin the hierarchy consists of:

Cotonou
Abomey
Dassa-Zoumé
Lokossa
Porto Novo
Parakou
Djougou
Kandi
Natitingou
N'Dali

See also
Catholic Church by country
Religion in Benin

References

External links
 http://www.gcatholic.org/dioceses/country/BJ.htm
 https://web.archive.org/web/20150322212115/http://lacroixdubenin.com/

 
Benin
Benin